The Murder of Kayleigh Haywood, a 15-year-old girl from Measham, Leicestershire, took place in November 2015, following online grooming by Luke Harlow, a 27-year-old man who had contacted her on the social networking website Facebook.

Harlow and Kayleigh exchanged 2,643 text messages following an initial contact on Facebook. Two weeks following the first contact, Kayleigh agreed to meet Harlow at his house in Ibstock, Leicestershire, on 13 November 2015. Upon meeting, Harlow supplied Kayleigh with large quantities of alcohol and touched her sexually. He then informed his neighbour, 29-year-old Stephen Beadman, that he had a “bird” at his house.

Beadman raped Kayleigh while she was drunk, before beating her to death with a brick. She was reported missing and a search was conducted to find her. Her body was found five days later in lakeside undergrowth near Ibstock. On 24 November 2015, an inquest heard that Kayleigh Haywood had died as a result of head and facial injuries, and her body had to be identified by dental records. A post-mortem examination also confirmed that she had been raped.

On 20 November 2015, shortly after being arrested in connection with the disappearance and ultimately the murder of Kayleigh Haywood, Leicestershire Police announced that Stephen Beadman had been charged with rape and murder, and that Luke Harlow had been charged with grooming and two counts of having sexual activity with a child. Both were remanded in custody to await trial.

Beadman admitted the murder of Kayleigh Haywood on 5 April 2016, while Harlow admitted the grooming and sexual activity charges, but denied a charge of false imprisonment, meaning that he would face a Crown Court trial on that charge, while Beadman's sentencing would be delayed until afterwards. Harlow was found guilty of that charge on 28 July 2016, with his sentencing and that of Beadman being heard 1 July 2016. Harlow was sentenced to 12 years in prison, while Beadman received a life sentence with a minimum term of 35 years, making him ineligible for parole until 2050. Harlow was found to have groomed two other girls online, aged 13 and 15, both of whom believed he was their boyfriend.

The grooming and murder of Kayleigh Haywood resulted in 'Kayleigh's Love Story', a film produced by Leicestershire Police and Affixxius Films which was shown to schoolchildren in Leicestershire and Rutland. A second documentary was screened on Channel 5, entitled 'Murder on the Internet'.

Stephen Beadman died from cardiac arrest and cerebral hypoxia in the hospital, while in prison custody, on 8 April 2021.

See also 
 List of solved missing person cases

References

External links
 Kayleigh's Love Story - Leicestershire Police

2015 in England
2015 murders in the United Kingdom
English people convicted of child sexual abuse
Formerly missing people
Incidents of violence against girls
Missing person cases in England
Murder in Leicestershire
November 2015 events in the United Kingdom
Rape in England